Novi Novog is an American viola player. She is sometimes simply credited as "Novi" and is a  cousin of Lauren Wood (also known as "Chunky"). In 1973, Novi became one of three members of her cousin's band Chunky, Novi and Ernie with the bassist Ernie Emerita.

Discography

Albums (with band)
Chunky, Novi & Ernie (1973)  viola, keyboards, background vocals
Chunky, Novi & Ernie (1977)  viola, keyboards, synthesizer, background vocals

Session work
Doobie Brothers - What Were Once Vices Are Now Habits (1974) viola on "Black Water" and "Spirit"
Montrose - Warner Brothers Presents... Montrose! (1975) viola on "Whaler"
Carly Simon - Another Passenger - (1976) viola
Doobie Brothers - Takin' It to the Streets (1976) viola
Lauren Wood - Lauren Wood (1979) - viola, synthesizer
Tom Johnston - Still Feels Good (1981) viola
Sheila E. -  The Glamorous Life (1984) violin
The Time - Ice Cream Castle (1984)  violin
Prince & the Revolution - Purple Rain (1984)  violin, viola
Prince & the Revolution - Around the World in a Day (1985) violin
Jennifer Warnes - Famous Blue Raincoat (1986) viola
10,000 Maniacs - In My Tribe (1987) viola
Bonnie Raitt - [[Luck of the Draw (album)|Luck of the Draw]] (1991) viola
Christopher Cross - Rendezvous (1993) viola
David Arkenstone - Another Star in the Sky (1995) viola on "Voices of the Night". and "Canyon of the Moon"
Freeway Philharmonic - Road to Joy (1995) viola
Freeway Philharmonic - Sonic Detour (1995) viola
Lauren Wood - Lauren Wood (1997)
Scott Weiland - 12 Bar Blues (1998) viola
Marianne Faithfull - Vagabond Ways (1999) viola
Michael Jackson - Invincible (2001) viola, contractor
Frank Zappa - Joe's Camouflage  (2014) viola, keyboards, vocals (June 1975-September 1975  The Mothers of Invention rehearsal recordings)
Valerie Carter - The Way It Is'' (1996) viola

External links
Biography
[ Discography]
[ Discography]

American rock violinists
American rock violists
Living people
People from Los Angeles
Year of birth missing (living people)
21st-century violinists
21st-century violists